Elaphidion lewisi is a species of beetle in the family Cerambycidae. It was described by Fisher in 1941.

References

lewisi
Beetles described in 1941